The 1967 Washington State Cougars football team was an American football team that represented Washington State University in the Athletic Association of Western Universities (AAWU) during the 1967 NCAA University Division football season. In their fourth and final season under head coach Bert Clark, the Cougars compiled a 2–8 record (1–5 in AAWU, tied for last), and were outscored 266 to 141.

The team's statistical leaders included Jerry Henderson with 836 passing yards, Mark Williams with 415 rushing yards, and Doug Flansburg with 461 receiving yards.

The Cougars won their first Apple Cup in nine years, a 9–7 win over the Huskies in Seattle. It was the final game on natural grass in Husky Stadium, which switched to AstroTurf in 1968.

The Cougars played six conference opponents and finally met USC and UCLA; both were last on the schedule in 1958, the final season of the Pacific Coast Conference (PCC). The only conference team missed by WSU in 1967 was California.

Clark was fired in late November with a season remaining on his three-year contract. He was succeeded in early January 1968 by Jim Sweeney, the head coach at Montana State in Bozeman, who agreed to a one-year contract at $20,000, and led the Cougars for eight seasons.

Schedule

Roster

NFL/AFL Draft
One Cougar was selected in the 1968 NFL/AFL Draft.

References

External links
 Game program: UCLA vs. WSU at Spokane – September 30, 1967
 Game program: Arizona State vs. WSU at Spokane – October 21, 1967
 Game program: Idaho at WSU – November 11, 1967

Washington State
Washington State Cougars football seasons
Washington State Cougars football